A nanoinverter, also referred to as a nano inverter or solar nano inverter, converts direct current (DC) from a single solar cell or small solar panel to alternating current (AC).

Advantages 
Nanoinverters have several advantages over microinverters (which are connected to larger than 100-watt solar panels). The main advantage is that, even small amounts of shading, debris or snow lines in any one solar cell, or a smaller panel failure, does not disproportionately reduce the output of an entire larger panel. Each nanoinverter obtains optimum power by performing maximum power point tracking for its connected panel.

Description

Building Integrated Photo Voltaics
BIPV modules produce direct current power from range 10 watts to 100 watts.

Integrated circuit-based AC nanoinverter on each module is reported to increase harvest rate by 30% and substantially decrease installation constraints.

Solar Cell
DC nanoconverter-on-chip is capable of harvesting from microwatts power and as low as 80mV (0.08V) voltage. Harvest rate has been reported to improve 30%-70% with an integrated MPPT and DC-DC booster.

References

External links
Inverter Manufacturer

Inverters
Photovoltaics